The 2012–13 season was Notts County Football Club's 124th year in the Football League and their third consecutive season in the third tier of English football.

League One

Standings

Results summary

Results round by round

Squad

Detailed overview

Statistics

|-
|colspan="14"|Players currently out on loan:

|-
|colspan="14"|Players who have left the club:

|}

Goal scorers

Disciplinary record

Transfers

In

Loans in

Out

Loans out

Contracts

Fixtures and Results

League One

FA Cup

League Cup

League Trophy

Awards 
 Supporters' Player of the Year: Gary Liddle
 Players' Player of the Year: Gary Liddle
 Manager's Player of the Year: Gary Liddle
 Golden Boot: Yoann Arquin

References

Notts County F.C. seasons
Notts County